Tainosphaeria is a genus of fungi within the Chaetosphaeriaceae family. This is a monotypic genus, containing the single species Tainosphaeria crassiparies.

References

External links
Tainosphaeria at Index Fungorum

Chaetosphaeriales
Monotypic Sordariomycetes genera